Yunwu Mountain, also known as The Cloud and Mist Mountain, is a mountain located in Shaoyang, Hunan, China, with a height of  above sea level. It is a part of Xuefeng Mountains.  

Yunwu Mountain is noted for Buddhist temples, such as Yunwu Temple, Chaoyang Temple and Baoding Temple.

References

Mountains of Hunan
Tourist attractions in Shaoyang